Marisol Calero (born 13 September 1963) is a Puerto Rican actress and singer.

Early years
Calero was born in Ponce, Puerto Rico, on 13 September 1963. As a child, Calero participated in school performances at the Academia del Perpetuo Socorro and briefly in the San Juan Children's Choir. As a teenager she attended the Escuela Libre de Música (Free School of Music) in San Juan where she continued to participate in the dramatic arts. She studied singing from the age of 14 under the sopranos Rina de Toledo, Vilna Echenique and Darysabel Isales.

Theatrical career
She started her professional career with a fino performance in a poetic musical, accompanied by her mother, the actress and politician Marta Font. She was a singer in various civic, college and professional groups. In time she rose to the theatrical horizon in Puerto Rico.

Singing career
In addition to her theatrical career in Puerto Rico, Calero also became a professional singer. Her first hit was "Conmigo no" ("Not with me") in 1986. This was followed by "Duende", "Ojalá", "Te voy a dejar", "Duendes de la noche" and "Frágil". A parody of "Duendes de la noche" became the comedic character Vitín Alicea's signature song, "Hombres en la noche".

As a singer, Calero represented Puerto Rico at the OTI Festival in Portugal in 1987. She also performed as an actress in Panama in El diluvio que viene.

US acting
At the beginning of the 1990s, Calero moved to Miami, Florida, where she worked telenovelas as well as theater plays. In 1994, she was named Star Actress of the Year at the 19th festival of the Arts Critics Awards for her role in Tal para cual where she performed with Evelio Taillac.

Calero was concurrently participating in various TV projects such as Aguamarina, starring Ruddy Rodríguez and Leonardo García, Hey Miami and the telenovela Me muero por ti, also filmed in 2000.

Puerto Rico acting
In 1998, Calero starred in Tal para cual at the San Juan Centro de Bellas Artes. She had a role in the movie Under Suspicion, which was filmed entirely in Puerto Rico. In March 2001, Calero was part of Huracán criollo of the dramatist Juan González-Bonilla.

In 2002, Calero was contracted by the Brazilian company Rede Globo for a role in Vale tudo, playing the role of Mercedes, a Mexican mother bringing up an adolescent daughter. A year later, she starred at the Abanico Theater in Coral Gables, Florida in El último de los amantes, the Spanish version of Neil Simon's The Last of the Red Hot Lovers. She starred in the role of four different characters. Prior to her acting in El último de los amantes, she was recognized by the Office of the Government of Puerto Rico in Miami together with Sully Díaz, Mara Croatto, Yolandita Monge and Adamari López.

In 2018, Calero acted alongside Myraida Chaves, Braulio Castillo Jr., Castillo's brother Jorge Castillo and others in a play named Aqui No Hay Quien Viva!.

Filmography
 Aguamarina (1997) TV (series) as Penelope
 Me muero por tí (1999) (TV series) as Jasmina
 Under Suspicion (2000) as Sergeant Arias
 Bala perdida (2003/II), a.k.a. Stray Bullet
 Ángel rebelde as Etelvina Perez (1 episode, 2004)
 Vale todo (2002) (TV series) as Mercedes
 Una historia común (2004) as Clarita
 Manuela y Manuel (2007) as Norma (a.k.a., "Manuela and Manuel" – USA)
 El Fantasma de Elena (2010) as La Nena Ochoa

Health issues
Calero suffered a cranial aneurysm on 21 August 2020 and was hospitalized at HIMA San Pablo hospital in Caguas.

Personal
Calero was married in 2018 to professional boxing promoter and television sportscaster, the well-known Ivonne Class. The couple divorced in 2021.

Calero currently resides in San Juan, Puerto Rico

See also

 List of Puerto Ricans

References

1963 births
Living people
Puerto Rican stage actresses
Singers from Ponce
Actresses from Ponce, Puerto Rico
20th-century Puerto Rican actresses
Puerto Rican telenovela actresses
Puerto Rican television actresses
21st-century Puerto Rican actresses
Puerto Rican LGBT actors
Puerto Rican LGBT singers